is a Buddhist temple of the Nichiren Shū located in the city of Kamogawa in Chiba Prefecture, Japan. Along with Kuon-ji in Yamanashi Prefecture, Ikegami Honmon-ji in the south of Tokyo, and Seichō-ji also in Kamogawa City, Tanjōji is one of the "Four Sacred Places of Nichiren Shū."

History 
A temple was founded on the location of Nichiren's birthplace in October 1276 by one of his disciples, Nichike. However, this early temple was destroyed by an earthquake in 1498, and again by an earthquake and tsunami in 1703, and was subsequently relocated further inland. The original site is now located offshore due to land subsidence. The temple underwent an expansion and reconstruction in the early 1700s under the sponsorship of Tokugawa Mitsukuni. However, with the exception of the Niōmon, all structures in the temple burned down in a fire in 1758. The temple has slowly reconstructed since that time, and has added numerous structures in the late 20th century through the efforts of a vigorous lay organization.

Important structures and cultural treasures 
 Niōmon, 1703, Tangible Cultural Property of Chiba Prefecture
 Main Hall, 1991
 Soshi-dō, 1842
 Honshi-den Hoto Pagoda, 1988
 Treasury, 1989
 Kyakuden, 1933
Seven mandalas inscribed by Nichiren (Kamakura period)

Gallery

References

External links 

 Tanjō-ji at Nichiren Shū official website

Religious organizations established in the 1270s
Buddhist temples in Chiba Prefecture
Nichiren
Nichiren-shū temples
Kamogawa, Chiba